The Bankstown Line (numbered T3, coloured orange) is a commuter rail line operated by Sydney Trains in Sydney, New South Wales, Australia. It serves Canterbury-Bankstown and parts of the Inner West and Western Sydney. The Bankstown railway line is the physical railway line which carries the section of the Bankstown Line between Sydenham and Birrong.

History

Railway line history
The Bankstown railway line opened between Sydenham on the Illawarra railway line and Belmore in 1895. This was the second solely suburban line to open in Sydney, following the North Shore railway line in 1890–all other rail lines were mainlines carrying traffic into and out of Sydney. In 1909, the line was extended to Bankstown, with intermediate stations at Lakemba and Punchbowl. In 1916, the Metropolitan Goods Line was constructed, running parallel to the Bankstown Line between Marrickville and Campsie. A second extension, from Bankstown to Birrong, opened in 1928. This provided connections to the main suburban railway at Lidcombe and the main south line to Liverpool. A new station between Lakemba and Punchbowl at Wiley Park opened in 1938.

In 1926 the Bankstown Line became the second line in Sydney to be electrified and a maintenance depot was constructed at Punchbowl. Electrification was extended from Bankstown to Regents Park in 1939. The Punchbowl Maintenance Depot closed in 1994.

In January 2006 a four-year project to upgrade the line was completed. The work included the resleepering of the entire line, replacing the former wooden sleepers with the more durable concrete ones, replacement and upgrade of the signalling, and also replacement of the ageing catenary, mostly with the more modern double contact wire variety. The lengthy upgrade process was noted for its "January Closedowns", in which the entire line was closed in January for the bulk of the upgrade work to take place.

Commuter line history
Electric passenger services operated along the Bankstown Line to Wynyard station until the 1956 opening of Circular Quay station and the completion of the City Circle. In 1979 with the opening of the Eastern Suburbs line the direction around the City Circle reversed with trips from Bankstown going to St James first and vice versa.

Operation of the Bankstown Line had been tied to the operation of all stations services on the Main Suburban railway line between Lidcombe and the city (marketed as the Inner West Line). Services consisted of a mixture of "Bankstown loop" trains (City - Sydenham - Bankstown - Lidcombe - Strathfield - City) and trains from both sides of the loop (Birrong or Regents Park) heading to Sefton and then further west. Until the early 2000s, a number of Bankstown trains continued via the Western Line to Blacktown via Granville and Parramatta.

A new timetable released in October 2013 broke the loop between the two lines. As part of the Rail Clearways Program, new turnbacks were constructed at Lidcombe and Homebush to allow the separation of both lines and increase their reliability and frequency. Services were also changed to operate mostly around the City Circle via Town Hall on weekdays (rather than via Museum). As part of the timetable change, a new numbering system was also introduced and the line was given the number T3. A sextuplication project between Erskinevile and Sydenham was also proposed as part of the Rail Clearways Program, but was cancelled in 2011. It was intended to separate Bankstown line services from those operating towards East Hills. The 2013 timetable sees most East Hills line trains using the Airport line to access the city.

The line was depicted in a brown colour in the early 1990s before being changed to a purple colour around 2000, before it became the current orange colour. From 2013 to 2019 the line was depicted in the same red colour as the T9.

Future projects

Sydney Metro City & Southwest is a plan to convert the Sydenham to Bankstown section of the line to use single deck metro trains. A new tunnel will be constructed between Sydenham and Chatswood, for access to the city. The stations of St Peters, Erskineville and the stations west of Bankstown towards Lidcombe / Liverpool will not be served by the metro. The NSW Legislative Council Inquiry into the Sydenham-Bankstown line conversion recommended that the direct train to City via Lidcombe be restored for commuters west of Bankstown. The NSW Government rejected most recommendations from this report.

In December 2020, it was confirmed that when the Bankstown Line closes for conversion to metro in 2024, the Liverpool to city service via Regents Park and Lidcombe will be reinstated and a shuttle branch service will run between Lidcombe and Bankstown. Regents Park will be the main interchange point between both lines as the direct train between Bankstown and Liverpool will be withdrawn.

Description of line
The Bankstown line begins at Sydenham railway station on the Illawarra line. The line branches at Sydenham Junction and passes in a westwards direction to Bankstown, where it heads north to Birrong. Between Marrickville and Campsie, the Metropolitan Goods line runs in parallel. At Birrong, the line meets the Main South Line which runs from Lidcombe to Cabramatta via Regents Park.

Commuter line route
Passenger services begin at Town Hall station on the City Circle. Most services operate around the City Circle in a clockwise direction to Central, then through Redfern. However both inbound and outbound trains can also travel in the counterclockwise direction around the City Circle, as of the November 2017 timetable. After Central, trains enter the Illawara railway line, using the local (western pair) tracks, stopping at St Peters and Erskineville stations. Just south of Sydenham, all trains take the turnout onto the Bankstown railway line. At Sefton Park Junction (west of Birrong), trains can turn onto both directions of the Main Southern railway line, running to Liverpool or Lidcombe.

The line serves two major centres in Western Sydney, namely Bankstown and Liverpool.

Patronage
The following table shows the patronage of Sydney Trains network for the year ending 30 June 2022.

References

External links

CityRail News and Media - Completion of the Bankstown line upgrade
CityRail News and Media - History of the Bankstown line

 
Standard gauge railways in Australia
Railway lines opened in 1909
Sydney Trains
Bankstown railway line
1909 establishments in Australia